Michael Antoine Crooms (born October 5, 1972), better known by his stage name Mr. Collipark (and also known as DJ Smurf), is an American hip hop producer and the president of his own Atlanta-based record label, Collipark Music, which was started in 1999.

The name Collipark was derived from the city of College Park, Georgia. Crooms is credited as playing a major role in the career of the Ying Yang Twins, Soulja Boy, Taurus, Hurricane Chris, V.I.C., and Vistoso Bosses.

In 2005, Mr. Collipark was featured on Bubba Sparxxx's single "Ms. New Booty", which peaked at number seven on the Billboard Hot 100. In 2007, Mr. Collipark won BMI's "Songwriter of the Year" award. He was also nominated for a 2008 Grammy for his work with Soulja Boy.

In 2011, Mr. Collipark debuted his mixtape Can I Have the Club Back Please, which features tracks from artists including Translee, Treal Lee & Prince Rick and the Ying Yang Twins.

Other ventures

Collipark Music

Crooms founded his record label Collipark Music in 1999. He has signed various artists to the label including Soulja Boy, Ying Yang Twins and Vistoso Bosses. As of 2013, there are rumors of Mr. Collipark signing a distribution deal with Epic Records for the label.

Current artists
 Mr. Collipark 
 Solace
 Tex James
 Translee
 Treal Lee & Prince Rick
 Ying Yang Twins

Former artists
 i15
 Part Time Arab
 Soulja Boy
 V.I.C.
 Vistoso Bosses

Producers
The Package Store
Mr. Collipark
Mr. Hanky
Tom Slick

Albums released on label

The Package Store and record producing
Mr. Collipark, along with his production/writing team The Package Store, have produced and written artists including Kilo Ali, Hurricane Chris, Mike Jones, Lil Jon, Jermaine Dupri, Soulja Boy, DJ Unk, E-40, Bubba Sparxxx, and Nia Chongg.

Discography

Studio albums
1995: Versastyles
1998: Dead Crunk

Mixtapes
2011: Can I Have the Club Back Please

References

Living people
African-American crunk musicians
African-American record producers
American hip hop record producers
American music industry executives
People from College Park, Georgia
Rappers from Georgia (U.S. state)
Southern hip hop musicians
1973 births
Record producers from Georgia (U.S. state)
21st-century American rappers
21st-century African-American musicians
20th-century African-American people
Crunk musicians